A digital locker is an online file storage service.

Digital locker may also refer to:
Digital Locker (mobile application), a mobile phone application by All State
Windows Marketplace, Digital Locker was a component of a Microsoft digital store
Digital Locker, a digital locker service in India